Sir Nicholas Brembre (died 20 February 1388) was a wealthy magnate and a chief ally of King Richard II in 14th-century England. He was Lord Mayor of London in 1377, and again from 1384–5,6. Named a "worthie and puissant man of the city" by Richard Grafton (who wrongly termed him a draper), he became a citizen and grocer of London, and in 1372-3 purchased from the Malmains family the estates of Mereworth, Maplescomb, and West Peckham, in Kent. His ties to Richard ultimately resulted in his downfall, as the anti-Richard Lords Appellant effectively took control of the government and imprisoned, exiled, or executed most of Richard's court. Despite Richard's efforts, Brembre was executed in 1388 for treason at the behest of the Lords Appellant.

Becoming Lord Mayor
Brembre comes from unknown origins, though he may be related to Sir Thomas Brembre (or Bramber), who served the king from 1347 to 1355. He first appears as an alderman and Sheriff of the City of London in 1372, sitting for the ward of Bread Street, in which he resided. The citizens were at this time divided into two factions, the party under John Northampton supporting John of Gaunt and John Wycliffe, while that headed by William Walworth and John Philipot supported the opposition and William Courtenay. On the fall of John of Gaunt and his partisans at the close of Edward III's reign (1377), Adam Stable, the then Lord Mayor, was deposed and replaced by Brembre, who belonged to the opposite party. He took his oath at the Tower on 29 March 1377, and was also re-elected for the succeeding year (1377–8). His "Proclamacio ... ex parte ... Regis Ricardi" in this mayoralty (as shown by the sheriffs' names) is given in the Cottonian manuscripts.

Political disputes
In the parliament of Gloucester (1378) Thomas of Woodstock, the king's uncle, demanded Brembre's impeachment as Lord Mayor for an outrage by a citizen on one of his followers, but the matter was compromised. He now became for several years (at least from 1379 to 1386) one of the two collectors of customs for the port of London, with Geoffrey Chaucer for his comptroller, his accounts being still preserved. The party to which Brembre belonged had its strength among the greater companies, especially the grocers, then dominant, and the fishmongers, whose monopoly it upheld against the clamours of the populace. It was oligarchical in its aims, striving to deprive the lesser companies of any voice in the city, and was consequently favourable to Richard's policy. At the Peasants' Revolt in 1381, Brembre, with his allies Walworth and Philipot, accompanied the king to Smithfield, and was knighted with them for his services on that occasion. 

He is mentioned as the king's financial agent in 21 December 1381 Issues of Exchequer, and as one of the leading merchants summoned "a treter and communer" with parliament on supplies, 10 May 1382. His foremost opponent, John Northampton, held the mayoralty for two years (1381–3) in succession to Walworth, but at the election of 1383 Brembre, who had been returned to parliament for the city at the beginning of this year, and who was one of the sixteen aldermen then belonging to the great Grocers' Company, "ove forte main … et gñt multitude des gentz … feust fait maire" William Stubbs calls attention to this forcible election as possessing "the importance of a constitutional episode," but wrongly assigns it to 1386.

Charges of corruption and tyranny
On the outbreak of John Northampton's riot in February 1384, Brembre arrested and beheaded a ringleader, John Constantyn, cordwainer. Our main knowledge of Brembre's conduct is derived from a bundle of petitions presented to parliament in October–November 1386 by ten companies of the rival faction, of which two (those of the mercers and cordwainers) are printed in the Rolls of Parliament, iii. 225–7. In these he is accused of tyrannous conduct during his mayoralty of 1383–4, especially of beheading the cordwainer Constantyn for the riot in Cheapside, and of securing his re-election in 1384 by increased violence.

Forbidding his opponents to take part in the election, he filled the Guildhall with armed men, (acorrding to the original Anglo-Norman French of the petition:  sailleront sur eux oue graunt noise criantz tuwez tuwez lour pursuiantz hydousement, (...the aforesaid armed men sprang out upon them with a great noise shouting “Slaughter! Slaughter!”, threateningly chasing them.). In 1386 he secured the election of his accomplice, Nicholas Exton, who was Lord Mayor at the time of the petition, so that the mayoralty was still, it urged, tenuz par conquest et maistrie (taken by conquest). While Lord Mayor (1384), Brembre had effected the ruin of his rival, John de Northampton (who had appealed in vain to John of Gaunt), by his favourite device of a charge of treason; and though Thomas of Woodstock, Duke of Gloucester, and the opposition accused him of plotting in favour of Suffolk (the chancellor), who was impeached in the parliament of 1386, and of compassing their death, he not only escaped for the time, but at the close of the year (1386) was, with Simon de Burley and others of the party of resistance, summoned by Richard into his council. Through the year 1387 he supported Richard in London in his struggle for absolute power, but was again accused by Gloucester and the opposition of inciting the mayor and citizens against them, when the former (Exton) shrank from such a plot.

Trial and execution
He was therefore among the five councillors charged with treason by the Lords Appellant on 14 November 1387, and, on the citizens refusing to rise for him, fled, but was captured (in Wales, says Jean Froissart) and imprisoned at Gloucester, until on 28 January 1388 he was moved to the Tower. The Merciless Parliament met on 3 February, and the five councillors were formally impeached by Gloucester and the Lords Appellant. Brembre, who was styled "faulx Chivaler de Londres", and who was hated by York and Gloucester, was specially charged with taking twenty-two prisoners out of Newgate and beheading them without trial at the "Foul Oke" in Kent. On 17 February he was brought from the Tower to Westminster before Parliament and put on trial. He pleaded "guilty of nothing" to all charges and claimed trial by battle as a knight, but it was refused. When the king supported him, 305 people in Parliament threw down their gauntlets opposing the king. He was sentenced on 20 February and was ordered to be taken back to the Tower, whence the marshal should "lui treyner parmye la dite cite de Loundres, et avant tan q'as ditz Fourches [Tyburn], et illeõqs lui pendre par le cool" The hanging was carried into effect, though he had "many intercessors" among the citizens but was reversed by Richard in his last struggle, 25 March 1399. John Stow in his annals incorrectly wrote that he was beheaded ("with the same axe he had prepared for other"). He was buried in the choir of the Christ Church Greyfriars

See also
 List of Sheriffs of the City of London
 List of Lord Mayors of London 
 City of London (elections to the Parliament of England)

References

Attribution

Year of birth unknown
Place of birth unknown
1388 deaths
14th-century lord mayors of London
Sheriffs of the City of London
Members of the Parliament of England for the City of London
Knights Bachelor
Executed English people
English politicians convicted of crimes
People executed under the Plantagenets by decapitation
People from Mereworth
People from West Peckham